Marjan Šetinc (born 15 May 1949, Šentlenart, Slovenia) is a former member of the Parliament of Slovenia (1992–1996) and a former ambassador to Ireland and the United Kingdom from Slovenia.

References and sources

Theory and Research in Education
Embassy of the Republic of Slovenia in London
Listed in Debrett's People of Today, 2000 Millennium Edition

Slovenian psychologists
Liberal Democracy of Slovenia politicians
Members of the National Assembly (Slovenia)
Living people
1949 births
People educated at Atlantic College
University of Ljubljana alumni
Alumni of the London School of Economics
Ambassadors of Slovenia to the United Kingdom
People from the Municipality of Brežice